Tony Arena (born circa 1965, Franklin Square, New York) – also known by his pen name Anonymous Boy – is an openly queer artist, writer, and filmmaker. He is known for his comics, his involvement in the queercore movement, and other contributions to queer punk zines, his column in Maximum Rocknroll magazine, his public-access television program The Wild Record Collection, and animation such as his film Green Pubes.

Career

Comics and artistic work 

He adopted the pen name Anonymous Boy after G.B. Jones, the editor of queer punk zine J.D.s, credited an illustration he'd submitted to "an anonymous boy". His erotic and romantic drawings of punks garnered much attention, and after the demise of J.D.s, his work appeared in many other publications such as Outpunk, Speed Demon, RFD, The Burning Times, Aunt Franne, Teen Fag, NYQ, YELL Zine, Androzine, and many more. His work is also featured in documentaries such as Queercore: How to Punk a Revolution. He also provided some record cover and insert art for the bands Pansy Division, The Lone Wolves, Limp Wrist and for the cover of the queer punk compilation record, Stop Homophobia #2, released by Turkey Baster Records.

Anonymous Boy was a queer punk zine that Arena began in the 1980s and ran through the early 2000s with nine known collections. This zine, with its title being the same as Arena’s pen name, is one of his most prominent.

Film and animation 
In 1995, Arena premiered his film Green Pubes, the first animated queercore movie, which played at film festivals around the world. Created on a limited budget, his DIY animation effect worked to the film's benefit.

After this, he and boyfriend Ron Grunewald began producing a regular public access television show called The Wild Record Collection which appears on Manhattan Neighborhood Public Access Television on Friday nights. The New York Press awarded the show Best Public Access Music Program of 1997. From September through October 2006 The Wild Record Collection was featured as part of a video-art exhibit called Everybody Dance Now, curated by Kathleen Goncharov for the Elizabeth Foundation for the Arts gallery in New York City, and in 2011 it was included as part of the "Shindig!" segment of "TV Party" at the Museum of The Moving Image in a screening honoring the eccentric aspects of Public Access Television. Public Access pioneer George C. Stoney, widely regarded as "the Father of Public Access" was in attendance to vehemently criticize the featured programs as the "worst" of what Public Access had to offer.

Tony enlisted the services of his friend Sarah Jacobson to help edit his contribution Metal or Muscle? for a Presto Project DVD produced by Widen + Kennedy for Nike. The animated short featured robots attempting to emulate the movements of street athletes. It was scored by his friend Sam Elwitt, a musician best known for The Nutley Brass and his musical scores in the Queer Duck series. The Metal or Muscle? cartoon short saw the return of the primitive Anonymous Boy animation technique first seen in Green Pubes, but refined. The unique DIY animation technique uses cut out figures in real-time movement. The figures wiggle and glide on a transparency across backgrounds. The overall effect is humorous, low-tech, and humanistic- a contrast to both traditional cell animation and to computer generated style.

Writings 
In 2001, Arena began writing a regular column for the long running punk rock zine Maximum Rocknroll. His column lasted until 2004. He continues to draw comics, contributes to books and publications, and produces his own fanzines Homopunk World, created in 1997. Homopunk World featured interviews with many queer punk comics and musicians, including G.B. Jones, C. Bard Cole, and Joe Butcher of the American Band Ludichrist. Arena would also include reviews of punk fanzines and music.

Arena also created Punk Rock Freakazoid, The Zine Sin?, Straight and Narrow, Filth, and Anonymous Boy among others. He is a regular contributor to the anthology Boy Trouble, edited by Robert Kirby and David Kelly. The last issue to be released as a zine, the 10th Anniversary issue of Boy Trouble appeared in 2004. Since then, two volumes of the anthology have been published, the first, The Book of Boy Trouble, in 2006, followed by The Book of Boy Trouble Volume 2 in 2008.

Recent work 
In 2008, he appeared in the G.B. Jones film The Lollipop Generation to which he also contributed a song by the same name for the film's soundtrack. The soundtrack included music by Jane Danger, Mariae Nascenti, Bunny & The Lakers and The Hidden Cameras among others. At the film's premiere for the Toronto "Images" film festival, he made a personal appearance along with fellow Lollipop Generation cast members Jena von Brucker, Jane Danger, Andrew Cecil, and Becky Palov.

He formed a punk rock band called The Spines in which he sings and plays the Electric Autoharp, an unusual instrument for punk. He is joined in The Spines by bass player Bunny Hirsch and drummer Rich Kabot. The Spines broke up and re-formed as the Pepper Kings with new membership. He had previously been in the bands Horror Planet and Bozo Shmo.

Personal life 
Arena resides in New York City. He has been in a relationship with Ron Grunewald since 1986.

Works

Books 
The Book of Boy Trouble 2: Born to Trouble, edited by Robert Kirby and David Kelly, Green Candy Press, October 2008 
The Book of Boy Trouble, edited by Robert Kirby and David Kelly, Green Candy Press; 1st edition (September 28, 2006) 
Boy Trouble, edited by Robert Kirby and David Kelly, Boy Trouble Books, 2005, 
What's Right?: Graphic Interpretations Against Censorship, Arsenal Pulp Press, 2003, 
What's Wrong?, edited by Robin Fisher, Arsenal Pulp Press, 2002, 
Queer Zines 2, edited by A.A. Bronson and Philip Aarons, Printed Matter Press, 2013,

Film

As Director

Green Pubes, 1995

As Actor
The Lollipop Generation directed by G.B. Jones, 2008

References

External links
Anonymous Boy on My Space

American comics artists
Underground cartoonists
American comics writers
Queercore
LGBT comics creators
Living people
Year of birth uncertain
1960s births
21st-century American LGBT people